Cedron or Cedrón may refer to:

Places
 Cedron, Brook of, or Kidron, near Jerusalem
 Cedron, Kansas
 Cedron, Missouri
 Cedron, Ohio

People
 Alvaro Saavedra Cedrón, discoverer of Clipperton Island in 1528
 Andrea Cedrón (born 1993), Peruvian swimmer
 Carlos Cedron (born 1933), Peruvian sports shooter
 Miguel Ángel López-Cedrón (born 1978), Spanish footballer
 Pablo Cedrón (1958–2017), Argentine actor
 Rosa Cedrón (born 1972), Spanish Galician singer and cellist
 Víctor Cedrón (born 1993), Peruvian footballer

Plants
 Aloysia citrodora, a culinary herb in the family Verbenaceae
 Simaba cedron, a medicinal plant in the family Simaroubaceae

See also
Kidron (disambiguation)